Indian Camp Hollow is a valley in Hickman County, Tennessee, in the United States. 

Indian Camp Hollow was named from a former Native American camping ground located there.

References

Landforms of Hickman County, Tennessee
Valleys of Tennessee
Native American history of Tennessee